Nobelius Station is situated on the Puffing Billy Railway, and opened in 1927. It currently consists of a short platform with a "Mallee Shed"-type corrugated iron waiting shelter, which includes a small lockable room, although there was also a more substantial building in the past. Trains do not usually stop at the station, except by prior arrangement.

Tourist railway stations in Melbourne
Railway stations in the Shire of Yarra Ranges